Goodyerinae is an orchid subtribe in the tribe Cranichideae.

Certain orchids in this subtribe are referred to as jewel orchids, for instance Ludisia, Goodyera, Dossinia, and Anoectochilus.

Genera
Genera accepted in Chase et al.'s 2015 updated classification of orchids:

 Aenhenrya
 Anoectochilus
 Aspidogyne
 Chamaegastrodia
 Cheirostylis
 Cystorchis
 Danhatchia
 Dossinia
 Erythrodes
 Eurycentrum
 Gonatostylis
 Goodyera
 Halleorchis
 Herpysma
 Hetaeria
 Hylophila
 Kreodanthus
 Kuhlhasseltia
 Lepidogyne
 Ludisia
 Macodes
 Microchilus
 Myrmechis
 Odontochilus
 Orchipedum
 Pachyplectron
 Papuaea
 Platylepis
 Rhamphorhynchus
 Rhomboda
 Schuitemania
 Stephanothelys
 Vrydagzynea
 Zeuxine

Other genera
 Meliorchis † (fossil)
 Ligeophila (possibly synonymous with Anoectochilus)
 Platythelys (possibly synonymous with Anoectochilus)

See also
 Taxonomy of the Orchidaceae

References

External links

 
Orchid subtribes